Series 31 of Top Gear, a British motoring magazine and factual television programme, was broadcast in the United Kingdom on BBC One and BBC One HD during late 2021. It was the fifth series to feature the presenting line-up of Chris Harris, Paddy McGuinness, and Freddie Flintoff, and the third to be broadcast on BBC One. This series saw the retention of the outdoor studio set at Television Centre, London from the previous series.

Episodes

Notes

References

External links
 Series 31 at the Internet Movie Database
 Episode list

2021 British television seasons
Top Gear seasons